The Selwyn Range is a mountain range in the Canadian Rockies in British Columbia. A subrange of the Park Ranges of the Continental Ranges, it is located west of Jasper National Park, east of Valemount and south of Mount Robson Provincial Park.

It was named after Alfred Selwyn, the first director of the Geological Survey of Canada.

The Fraser River originates in this mountain range, near Fraser Pass.

See also 
Overlander Mountain
Klapperhorn Mountain
Mount McKirdy

References

Mountain ranges of British Columbia
Ranges of the Canadian Rockies